Carlos Alfonso de Mitjans y Fitz-James Stuart, 21st Count of Teba, GE (3 May 1907 – 28 August 1997) also known as Bunting, was a Spanish nobleman and distinguished hunter, most noted for being one of the greatest Olympic shooters of his time. He was a son of Juan Manuel de Mitjans y Manzanedo, 2nd Duke of Santoña, and his spouse Eugenia María Fitz-James Stuart y Falcó, 21st Countess of Teba and sister of the 17th Duke of Alba. Through his mother he was a Stuart, a male line grandchild of James II, and was a relative and close friend of the British royal family.

A celebrated icon of elegance in the world of menswear, his sartorial legacy has stood the test of time. The Teba jacket, a vastly popular country garment, is his most revered contribution.

Biography

Early years
Carlos was born 3 May 1907 in his family's finca (estate), "Ventosilla", in Polán, Toledo, Spain. His father was Juan Manuel de Mitjans y Manzanedo, 2nd Duke of Santoña, whose father bought the estate and refurbished it to receive frequent visits from Alfonso XIII to shoot red-legged partridge. His mother was Eugenia María Fitz-James Stuart y Falcó, 21st Countess of Teba, sister of the 17th Duke of Alba and of the 18th Duke of Peñaranda. Eugenia was a member of the House of Stuart, as a direct male line descendant of James FitzJames, son of James II and Arabella Churchill, herself a sister of the 1st Duke of Marlborough. This shared lineage with the British royal family was visible through Carlos' good relationship with his distant relative, Queen Elizabeth and particularly with her husband the Duke of Edinburgh, with whom he shared many shooting outings.

In 1966, Teba was one of the hosts of Jacqueline Kennedy during her visit to Seville.

Marriage and issue
Teba married Elena Verea y Corcuera, a lady from a distinguished Mexican family. The wedding took place 1 March 1935 in the church of Saint-Philippe-du-Roule, Paris. They had three daughters:
Macarena Mitjans y Verea, 23rd Countess of Teba
Sofía Mitjans y Verea
María de los Reyes Mitjans y Verea, 20th Marchioness of Ardales

Titles
 19th Marquess of Ardales
 21st Count of Teba
15th Count of Baños (GE)

References

Bibliography

 

1907 births
1997 deaths
Grandees of Spain
20th-century Spanish nobility